Matt Vaega (born 7 September 1994) is a New Zealand rugby union player who currently plays as a midfield back for  in the Mitre 10 Cup.

Early career

The son of n legend To'o Vaega, he was born and raised in Auckland, New Zealand and attended school at Kelston Boys' High School.   While there, he helped them to lift the World Rugby Youth Tournament in Japan.

Senior career

Vaega began his senior career with Auckland-based, North Harbour in 2014 scoring 2 tries in 6 appearances.   Although the season was not successful for Harbour, Vaega impressed in their midfield and was retained for the following season.   He played 9 times in 2015 and was then an ever present during Harbour's Championship winning season in 2016, scoring 4 tries in the process.

Super Rugby

Impressive form at provincial level was rewarded when after only 6 senior appearances, he was surprisingly included in the  wider training group for the 2015 Super Rugby season.

New head coach Tana Umaga dropped him from the squad for 2016 Super Rugby season, however a mid-season injury crisis in the Blues midfield saw him called upon as an injury replacement and he made 2 appearances from the replacements bench.

Outstanding performances in North Harbour's successful Mitre 10 Cup campaign in 2016 saw him earn a recall to the Blues squad for 2017.

International

Vaega represented New Zealand Schools in 2012.

Career Honours

North Harbour

Mitre 10 Cup Championship - 2016

Super Rugby Statistics

References

1994 births
Living people
New Zealand rugby union players
Rugby union centres
North Harbour rugby union players
Blues (Super Rugby) players
Rugby union players from Auckland
New Zealand sportspeople of Samoan descent
People educated at Kelston Boys' High School
Mitsubishi Sagamihara DynaBoars players